Ejaculation disorders are the most common sexual dysfunction in men. Common ejaculatory disorders include: premature ejaculation, retrograde ejaculation, delayed ejaculation, anejaculation, inhibited ejaculation, and anorgasmia.

See also 
 Men's health

References
There may be physical & psychological reasons for general sexual dysfunction. Men are generally much less likely to discuss their sexual issues because sex is such a sensitive subject for them. Several typical reasons for sexual disorders in men include:

Male genital disorders
Ejaculation